The 1996 Wisconsin Badgers football team represented the University of Wisconsin during the 1996 NCAA Division I-A football season. They were led by seventh year head coach Barry Alvarez and participated as members of the Big Ten Conference. The Badgers played their home games at Camp Randall Stadium in Madison, Wisconsin.

Schedule

Season summary
Wisconsin started off quickly in 1996, winning their first three games against Eastern Michigan, UNLV, and Stanford. However, the Badgers then encountered far stiffer opposition against Penn State, Ohio State, Northwestern, and Michigan State. In the Northwestern game, Wisconsin RB Ron Dayne stunningly fumbled with just under a minute remaining. Northwestern recovered and scored the winning touchdown, sealing Wisconsin's third consecutive loss. The Badgers lost their fourth straight game the next week, falling 30–13 to Michigan State.

The Badgers snapped their four-game losing streak with consecutive wins against Purdue and rival Minnesota, before suffering a humiliating 31–0 loss at the hands of Hayden Fry's Iowa Hawkeyes. After falling to 5–5, the Badgers would win the final games on their regular season slate by beating Illinois and Hawaii, earning a bid to the Copper Bowl. The Badgers defeated the Utah Utes 38–10 in the 1996 Copper Bowl.

Wisconsin RB Ron Dayne ran for over 2,000 yards and 21 touchdowns in the 1996 season, earning Big Ten Freshman of the Year Honors in the process.

Roster

Regular starters

Team players selected in the 1997 NFL Draft

References

Wisconsin
Wisconsin Badgers football seasons
Guaranteed Rate Bowl champion seasons
Wisconsin Badgers football